Qazi Afsaruddin Ahmed was a Bengali journalist and writer.

Early life
Ahmed was born on 24 September 1921 in Chatmohar, Pabna District, East Bengal, British India. He studied in Chittagong Collegiate School.

Career
Ahmed started working as a journalist in Kolkata. From 1941 to 1946, he served as the editor of Mrittika magazine. He worked at Shaogat and Dexer Katha. From in 1945 to 1947, he served as the acting editor of The Mohammadi. He moved to Dhaka following the Partition of India. He worked as the editor of the daily Zindegi in 1947. He also worked as the editor of Insaf newspaper. He started working as the senior sub-editor of Pak-Samachar and Nabarun of the Information Department of the Pakistan government in 1951. He worked there till 1972. In 1966, he was awarded the Bangla Academy Award for literature for Char Bhanga Char, his novel published 1951. He did not support the independence of Bangladesh.

Death
Ahmed on 26 March 1975 in Dhaka, Bangladesh.

References

1921 births
1975 deaths
People from Pabna District
Bangladeshi journalists
Bangladeshi male writers
20th-century journalists
Pakistani writers